Dennes De Kegel (born 7 January 1994) is a Belgian footballer who plays as a right back for Belgian football club SK Londerzeel.

Club career
De Kegel joined Cercle Brugge in January 2014 from K.R.C. Genk. He made his debut on 5 April 2014 in the Jupiler Pro League. He played the full game in a 0-1 home defeat against KV Mechelen.

References

External links
 
 

1994 births
Living people
Association football defenders
Belgian footballers
Belgium youth international footballers
Cercle Brugge K.S.V. players
Belgian Pro League players
Challenger Pro League players
Flemish sportspeople